Austrocortilutein is an organic compound that also serves as an antibacterial metabolite found in the Dermocybe splendida mushroom.

Notes 

Antimicrobials
Natural phenols
Trihydroxyanthraquinones